Richard J. Shaw, AIA, (d.1958) was an American architect active in mid-twentieth-century Boston, Massachusetts and partner in the architectural firm of O'Connell and Shaw and founding principal in the eponymous architectural firm that specialized in ecclesiastical design.

Early life and education
Shaw graduated from the Harvard School of Design in 1912.

Architectural practice
In 1921, Shaw entered into a partnership with Timothy G. O'Connell to form the firm of O'Connell and Shaw, which was located in Boston, Massachusetts, and lasted for six years. Thereafter, Mr. O'Connell and Mr. Shaw continued to practice under their own names.

Awards
Shaw was a four-time recipient of the Harleston Parker Medal for outstanding architectural work in the greater Boston community. Perhaps his most famous design is that of the Hatch Memorial Shell in Boston.

Works as O’Connell and Shaw
 St. Andrew Church, Forest Hills, Massachusetts
 St. Polycarp Church, Somerville, Massachusetts
 St. Mary Italian Church, Salem, Massachusetts
 Sacred Heart Church, Yarmouth, Maine
 St. Mary Church,  Biddeford, Maine
 St. Mary Church,  Lewiston, Maine
 St. Mary Church,  Augusta, Maine
 Our Lady of Sorrows Church, Hartford, Connecticut
 St. Peter and St. Paul Basilica, Lewiston, Maine
 Sacred Heart Church, Waterville, Maine
 Brighton High School, Brighton, Massachusetts
 Grover Cleveland School, Dorchester, Massachusetts
St. Mary Church, Stamford, Connecticut
St. Mary Church, Norwich, Connecticut

Works as Richard J. Shaw
Immacuate Conception Convent, Malden, Massachusetts
St. Mary Church Lynn, Massachusetts
St. Clement Church, Somerville, Massachusetts
Corpus Christi Church, Newton, Massachusetts
Hatch Memorial Shell, Boston, Massachusetts

References

1958 deaths
Architects of Roman Catholic churches
Harvard Graduate School of Design alumni
American ecclesiastical architects
Year of birth missing
Architects from Boston